Gyula Szabó (15 July 1930 – 4 April 2014) was a Hungarian actor. He won two Mari Jászai Prizes. He appeared in forty movies between 1953 and 2002. He is best known for appearing in movies such as Ifjú szívvel (1953), Kiskrajcár (1953), Egy pikoló világos (1955), A tizedes meg a többiek (1965) and Defekt (1977). He was the Hungarian voice of the eponymous American television character Columbo and the narrator of the Hungarian Folktales animated television series. He was born in Kunszentmárton, Jász-Nagykun-Szolnok County.

Szabó died on 4 April 2014 at the age of 83.

References

External links
 

1930 births
2014 deaths
Hungarian male film actors
Hungarian male stage actors
Hungarian male television actors
People from Kunszentmárton